The Hundred of Wallala is a cadastral unit of hundred in the County of Dufferin, South Australia.

The traditional custodians of the land were the Nawu people.

See also
 Lands administrative divisions of South Australia

References

Wallala